Two a Penny is a 1967 British film, released nationally in 1968, featuring singer Cliff Richard. The film was directed by James F. Collier and produced by Frank R. Jacobson for Billy Graham's film distribution and production company World Wide Pictures. The original story and screenplay was written by Stella Linden.

The cast included Ann Holloway, Dora Bryan, Avril Angers, Geoffrey Bayldon, Peter Barkworth, Mona Washbourne, Earl Cameron, Charles Lloyd-Pack, and Billy Graham himself, filmed at his "London Crusade" in 1967.

Plot
Jamie Hopkins (Cliff Richard) is an art student and frustrated pop star who lives with his mother (Dora Bryan). She works as a receptionist for Dr. Berman (Donald Bisset), a psychiatrist who is experimenting with psychedelic drugs. Jamie wants to make money quickly, and begins to work at the doctor's office as a pretence in order to steal drugs.

When his girlfriend Carol (Ann Holloway) is converted to Christianity while attending a crusade led by evangelist Billy Graham, she attempts to show him the error of his ways. Soon after, Jamie is caught stealing from Dr. Berman's drug supply, and attempting to double-cross drug dealer Alec Fitch (Geoffrey Bayldon).

Initially hostile toward his girlfriend's newfound faith, Jamie eventually accepts it.

Cast
Cliff Richard - Jamie Hopkins 
Dora Bryan - Ruby Hopkins 
Ann Holloway - Carol Turner 
Avril Angers - Mrs. Burry 
Geoffrey Bayldon - Alec Fitch 
Peter Barkworth - Vicar 
Donald Bisset - Dr. Berman 
Edward Evans - Jenkins 
Mona Washbourne - Mrs. Duckett 
Tina Packer - Gladys 
Earl Cameron - Verger 
Noel Davis - Dennis Lancaster 
Nigel Goodwin - Hubert 
Charles Lloyd-Pack - Reverend Allison 
Billy Graham - Himself

Reception
The "Billy Graham movies" were an effort to "extend the Billy Graham ministry into a filmic medium." Their standards of success were therefore not the usual Hollywood standards. This film followed one of several formulas, developing a small cult following due to several notable factors, as Peter T. Chattaway writes:Two a Penny stars Cliff Richard, who I do admire, as well as a number of actors I fondly recognize from other British films (including To Sir with Love and The Family Way); because it is the only film so far in which dramatic action takes place on the actual platform from which Billy Graham speaks at the London crusade (in contrast to all the other films, where footage of Graham’s sermons is spliced into an otherwise unrelated dramatic story, and the closest the characters ever get to the stage is milling about with the other converts after they come forward); because it is the first film in which the title song represents a character’s troubled inner thoughts and not the message of the film; because it ends on an ambiguous note in which the protagonist’s salvation is still kind of up in the air; and for other, smaller reasons besides. Alas, the version on the WWP website is only 65 minutes or so, but I understand a 97-minute version is available on DVD in Britain... Still, even in its bowdlerized form, the film’s merits do come through.

Soundtrack

The soundtrack album Two a Penny by Cliff Richard was released in August 1968. It was his fifth film soundtrack and his twenty-third album overall.

Accompaniment is credited to the Mike Leander Orchestra and production to Norrie Paramor.

Track listing:
Side A:
Two A Penny (2:44)
"I'll Love You Forever Today" (3:08)
"Questions" (2:53)
"Long Is The Night" (instrumental) (2:32)
"Lonely Girl" (3:09)
"And Me (I'm On The Outside Now)" (3:02)
"Daybreak" (instrumental) (2:20)

Side B:
"Twist and Shout" (2:39)
"Celeste" (instrumental) (2:47)
"Wake Up Wake Up" (2:37)
"Cloudy" (2:19)
"Red Rubber Ball" (2:07)
"Close to Kathy" (2:57)
"Rattler" (2:52)

References

External links
 
 
 Soundtrack at All Music Guide 

1968 films
British drama films
1968 musical films
Films about evangelicalism
Films directed by James F. Collier
1960s English-language films
1960s British films